Alexander Nikolayevich Ryazanov (born 13 October 1953 in Yuzhno-Kurilsk, Sakhalin Oblast, Russian SFSR, Soviet Union) is a Russian businessman and politician.

Business career 
In 1988-1998, he was the CEO of the Surgut Gas Processing Factory. From November 2001 to 16 November 2006, he was a First Deputy Chairman of the Board of Directors of Gazprom. He was the President of Sibneft (Gazprom Neft) from October 2005 to November 2006. Since July 2004, Ryazanov has been a member of the Coordination Committee of RosUkrEnergo.

Elected office 
In 2000–2001, Ryazanov was a deputy of the State Duma.

References

External links 
Epr-magazine.ru.  Alexander Ryazanov Profile 
Politcom.ru.  Information about Alexander Ryazanov 

Russian politicians
Russian businesspeople in the oil industry
Living people
Gazprom people
1953 births
Third convocation members of the State Duma (Russian Federation)
People from Sakhalin Oblast